Cono Christian School was a private Christian school founded in 1951 near Walker, Iowa, by Max and Jean Belz serving K-12 day and boarding students from around the United States and the world. Boarding students were generally in middle and high school.

In 2017 the 192-acre property and facility began use as a camp and retreat center of Ridge Haven, the camp and conference center of the Presbyterian Church in America. Summer camps were planned for 2018.

This Christian boarding school began as a ministry of Bible Presbyterian Church (PCA). Max Belz was the pastor of the church at the time of the school's founding. Today Cono has , 25 of which are developed with academic, athletic and student and staff residential facilities.

References

External links 

 Cono Christian School website

Boarding schools in Iowa
Christian schools in Iowa
Educational institutions established in 1951
Schools in Linn County, Iowa
Private high schools in Iowa
Private middle schools in Iowa
Private elementary schools in Iowa
1951 establishments in Iowa